Asylum Seekers is an American black comedy film written and directed by Rania Ajami. The film stars Pepper Binkley and Daniel Irizarry as two of the six social outcast protagonists who attempt to get themselves committed to an insane asylum in order to spice up their lives. Bill Dawes, Judith Hawking, Stella Maeve, Camille O'Sullivan and Lee Wilkof also star.

In its spring 2008 issue, the independent film magazine Filmmaker reported that Asylum Seekers was one of the first independent feature films to be completed on the Red Digital Cinema Camera Company's Red One camera. The film premiered at the 2009 European Film Market (Berlin International Film Festival) and made its North American debut at the 2009 CineVegas International Film Festival. The rights to global distribution sales for Asylum Seekers were obtained by Shoreline Entertainment and the film was released in North America on DVD/VOD by Breaking Glass Pictures under their Vicious Circle Films label.

Plot
Six introverted individuals, bored with their lives and trying to escape their daily routine, attempt to find a radical solution to their boredom by getting themselves admitted into a psychiatric hospital. Among these individuals are: Maud (Pepper Binkley), a bored trophy wife who feels trapped in a loveless marriage; Antoine (Daniel Irizarry), a sex-obsessed virgin; Alice (Stella Maeve), a woman whose only enjoyment comes from computers; Miranda (Camille O'Sullivan), a paranoid exhibitionist whose inhibitions make her dislike being the center of attention; Paul (Lee Wilkof), a fanatical right-wing conspiracy theorist; and Alan (Bill Dawes), an androgynous rapper.

Upon arriving to the asylum, the six individuals are informed that there is only room for one person in the hospital. Nurse Milly (Judith Hawking) informs the individuals that they will now have to compete for the only remaining spot in the asylum. The nurse proceeds to administer tests and contests and whomever she deems to be the craziest and most insane will be declared the winner and will be committed into the institution. The competition and everything in the institution is always watched over and supervised by an unseen character known only as "The Beard".

Cast
 Pepper Binkley as Maud
 Daniel Irizarry as Antoine Raby
 Bill Dawes as Alan
 Stella Maeve as Alice
 Camille O'Sullivan as Miranda
 Lee Wilkof as Paul
 Judith Hawking as Nurse Milly

Production
In an interview with indieWire, director Rania Ajami stated that the idea for the film came from a recurring dream that her brother had about a "giant beard" that was trying to devour him. From the premise of her brother's dreams, Ajami created a play titled The Giant Swearing Beard that told the story of six people trying to break into an asylum. About six years later, Ajami was inspired by discussions about political asylum seekers and decided that a film based on the premise of her play would be a suitable metaphor for the real-world political issues.

With an estimated budget of US $1.5 million, the creators of the film made adjustments to stay within the modest budget while also attempting to stay true to the "visual scope of the film " and the perceived "fantasy world".

Asylum Seekers was filmed entirely on Red Digital Cinema Camera Company's Red One camera, a digital video camera capable of recording video in 12-megapixel resolution directly to flash memory or a hard disk drive. As of August 2008, the Red One was being used to film at least 40 feature films but Asylum Seekers is one of the first independent film features to use the camera. The production team of the film opted for the Red One because if offered significant financial savings over a 35 mm film camera while not compromising image quality.

Rania Ajami said that the casting process took over a year because she found that the biggest challenge in the production process "was to find good people to work with". The production was then halted for another month before the filming could begin because Ajami had contracted Infectious Mononucleosis — usually referred to as mono — and had to spend a month in bed.

Release, promotion and distribution
Asylum Seekers had its world premiere at the European Film Market on the first day of the 59th Berlin International Film Festival, which was held from February 5 until February 15, 2009 in Berlin, Germany. The film was then screened on June 13 and 14 at the 2009 CineVegas International Film Festival in Las Vegas, Nevada. During CineVegas, the film's public relations representative arranged for a wedding to take place on the red carpet immediately before the film's initial showing at the Palms Casino Resort. The film's director Rania Ajami explained the reasoning behind the stunt claiming that the "two institutions, the institution of marriage and the mental institution in which the majority of film is set, were sufficient bonding agents".  Further, the Red Carpet wedding was a Las Vegas-centric experience, "couples come to Las Vegas to marry, see shows, Elvis impersonators," Ms. Ajami explained.  "We stayed true to the locale of the festival, and created a crazy all Vegas show for a Vegas festival." The bride and groom we're from Houston, Texas and were selected because they were young, and self-proclaimed "fun" people, which matched the demographic of the film.  The infamous Little White Wedding Chapel in Las Vegas helped select the suitable couple.

The film's global distribution sales rights were acquired by Shoreline Entertainment. The deal, which was announced in August 2008, was negotiated between Shoreline's acquisitions and worldwide distribution departments and Asylum Seekers producer, Molly Connors, and executive producer, Christopher Woodrow.

Reception
Charles Tatum of eFilmCritic.com awarded Asylum Seekers three stars calling the film's initial set-up as "promising" and declaring that "the possibilities are endless" after watching the opening part of the film. However, Tatum criticized the film for being too "bizarre" and "exhausting", stating that his opinion that "the surrealism should have been toned down" and concluded by calling the film "even more insane than its characters". He also added that, although the film lacked "strong characterization", the cast deserved praise for a "great job playing characters that are way way out there". Tatum did commend the director for her use of widescreen, "creepy imagery" and compared her work to works of Terry Gilliam and Jean-Pierre Jeunet.

Film critic T.R. Witcher of the Las Vegas Weekly awarded the film two stars. Witcher also applauded the opening sequences of Asylum Seekers for "brimming with ideas" and that it "begins with a promising premise". Ultimately, Witcher criticized the film by concluding that it lacks "storytelling discipline" and that it contains "even less human emotion". Agreeing with Tatum that Asylum Seekers is "surreal", he felt that its "fairly limp" comedy undercuts the suspenseful psychological atmosphere created by the film's surrealism.

References

External links
 
 

2009 films
2009 independent films
American independent films
Films set in New York City
American black comedy films
American neo-noir films
2000s English-language films
2000s American films